Moncef Ouichaoui (born April 5, 1977, in Annaba, Algeria) is an Algerian international football player who last played as a forward for CA Bordj Bou Arreridj in the Algerian Championnat National.

National team statistics

Honours
 Won the Algerian League once with USM Alger in 2003
 Won the Algerian Cup two times with USM Alger in 2001 and 2003
 Finished as top scorer of the Algerian League once with USM Alger in 2003 with 18 goals
 Scored 3 goals in USM Alger's run to the semi-finals of the 2003 African Champions League
 Has 1 cap for the Algerian National Team

References

 

1977 births
Algerian footballers
Algeria international footballers
JS Kabylie players
Living people
USM Alger players
NA Hussein Dey players
CA Batna players
CA Bordj Bou Arréridj players
USM Annaba players
People from Annaba
AS Khroub players
Algeria under-23 international footballers
Association football forwards
21st-century Algerian people